Mike + The Mechanics is the debut album by the Genesis bassist and guitarist Mike Rutherford's band Mike + The Mechanics in 1985. The album reached number 26 on the Billboard 200 album charts and had three hit singles. "Silent Running", featuring lead vocals by Paul Carrack, and the uptempo "All I Need Is a Miracle", featuring lead vocals by Paul Young, both reached the top 10 of the Billboard Hot 100 chart, peaking at numbers 6 and 5 respectively, with the former also peaking at number 1 on the Mainstream Rock Tracks chart. The third single off the album, "Taken In", was a lesser hit, reaching No. 32 on the Hot 100 and No. 7 on the Adult Contemporary  chart. "Silent Running" and "All I Need is a Miracle" were also hits in the UK, reaching numbers 21 and 53 in the UK Singles Chart respectively.

Background and recording
Mike Rutherford began constructing the album's set of tracks by playing demo tapes containing musical pieces in various stages of development (in some cases no more than isolated riffs and fragments but a few seconds long) to producer Christopher Neil. Neil then told him which bits he thought were worth developing, and Rutherford began building these pieces into full-fledged songs. With the exception of "Silent Running", which Rutherford co-wrote with B. A. Robertson, the final versions of the songs were drafted by Neil; in Rutherford's words, "He's much better at finishing, and I'm much better at starting, so it was a good combination."

In most cases, the lyrics were written by Rutherford. However, he credits Neil for writing the lyrics to the verses of "You Are the One".

Rutherford originally conceived "Par Avion" as a heavy song "with powerful drums", but Neil adapted it into a soft ballad, which Rutherford agreed was a better approach to the composition. The song was featured in the Miami Vice episode "Yankee Dollar".

"A Call to Arms" began as an unfinished "bit" from the Genesis album sessions which none of the members liked, aside from Rutherford. Rutherford received permission from Genesis bandmates Phil Collins and Tony Banks to use it for the Mechanics, then developed it into a full song with help from Christopher Neil and B.A. Robertson.

Reception

In their retrospective review, Allmusic lauded the strong performances of all the band members, while noting that the creative and powerful songwriting is the most important element of the album. They oddly concluded that though Mike + the Mechanics' second album was a bigger commercial success, "their debut reflects a more compliant (sic) sound in every aspect."

Track listing

Personnel 
Mike + The Mechanics
 Mike Rutherford – electric guitars, bass, backing vocals
 Paul Carrack – lead vocals (1, 5, 8), backing vocals 
 Paul Young – lead vocals (2, 4, 6, 9), backing vocals
 Adrian Lee – keyboards
 Peter Van Hooke – drums

Additional personnel
 Dereck Austin – keyboards
 Ian Wherry – keyboards
 Alan Murphy – electric guitars
 Luís Jardim – percussion
 Ray Beavis – saxophone
John Earle – saxophone
 John Kirby – lead vocals (3, 7)
 Gene Stashuck – backing vocals (8)
 Alan Carvel – backing vocals
 Christopher Neil – backing vocals
 Linda Taylor – backing vocals

Production 
 Christopher Neil – producer 
 Simon Hurrell – engineer 
 Barry Diament – mastering at Atlantic Studios (New York, NY).
 Lewis Moberly – cover design 
 Geoff Halpin – design 
 Peter Anderson – photography

Charts

References

Mike + The Mechanics albums
1985 debut albums
Albums produced by Christopher Neil
Atlantic Records albums
Warner Music Group albums
Virgin Records albums
Albums recorded at AIR Studios